Al Wasl Sports Club is a multi-sports club in Dubai, the United Arab Emirates. It is best known for its football team.

Current Board of Directors

See also
 Al Wasl FC

References

Al-Wasl F.C.
Multi-sport clubs in the United Arab Emirates
Sport in Dubai
Sports clubs established in 1962